Nikolai Aleksandrovich Uglanov (December 5, 1886 – May 31, 1937) was a Russian Bolshevik politician and Soviet statesman who played an important role in the government of the Soviet Union as a Communist Party leader in the city of Moscow during the 1920s. Uglanov was closely associated with the so-called "Right Deviation" associated with Soviet party leader Nikolai Bukharin and he fell from his leadership position during the mass collectivization campaign of 1929. Uglanov was arrested in the summer of 1936 and was executed the following spring during the secret police terror of 1937–38.

Biography

Early years

Nikolai Aleksandrovich Uglanov was born 5 December 1886 to an ethnic Russian peasant family in the village of Feodoritskoye in Yaroslavl Governorate, located approximately 250 kilometers (160 mi) northeast of Moscow. His father Aleksander Uglanov supplemented the family income by working seasonally in the city of St. Petersburg and at the age of 12 Nikolai followed him there, working as an apprentice metal worker. Nikolai moved between jobs with some regularity and often returned home to Yaroslavl in between jobs.

Uglanov was introduced to radical ideas at an early age, beginning his participation in the revolutionary movement in 1903, distributing illegal literature and storing sensitive documents for underground activists. Uglanov joined the Russian Social Democratic Labour Party himself in 1907. As a young party activist Uglanov contributed material to the Bolshevik party paper Pravda as a worker-correspondent.

Uglanov was arrested for the first time by the Okhrana early in the summer of 1914 but he was subsequently released from captivity and inducted into the Army and sent to the front lines to fight for the Tsarist regime in World War I. In November 1914 Uglanov was severely wounded and was returned to Petrograd (St. Petersburg), where he recovered and resumed his secret revolutionary activity.

Political career

During the Russian revolution Uglanov was a member of the Petrograd Soviet.

Uglanov became a functionary in the Soviet trade union movement and was selected as the head of the Petrograd Guberniia council of trade unions in 1919.'

In February 1921 Uglanov succeeded Sergey Zorin as secretary of the Petrograd guberniia committee of the Russian Communist Party [RKP(b)]. In this capacity he played a role in the suppression of the Kronstadt uprising, activity for which he was awarded the Order of the Red Banner. He was also made a candidate member of the governing Central Committee of the Communist Party in that year.

Uglanov was sent to the city of Nizhny Novgorod in 1922 where he was made the head of the regional party organization. In 1923 he would be elevated to a full member of the Central Committee of the RKP(b). He would remain as head of the Nizhny Novgorod organization until the summer of 1924.

In August 1924 Uglanov was called to Moscow, where he was made the second secretary of the Communist Party in the city. He was promoted to first secretary that same October.

 20 August 1924 – November 27, 1928, First Secretary of the Moscow Communist Party
 August 1924 - replaced Isaak Zelensky on the Secretariat of the CPSU Central Committee
 1 January 1926 elected candidate member of the Politburo of the Central Committee of the Communist Party of the Soviet Union
 29 November 1928 — 1 July 1930, People's Commissar for Labour

In 1930 he became associated with Martemyan Ryutin, whose name was given to the Ryutin Platform. Ryutin was Secretary of the Krasnaya Presnya district Party committee in Moscow. Uglanov was expelled from the Party along with Ryutin in autumn 1932 in what is known as the Ryutin Affair.

He was arrested on 23 August 1936, sentenced to death on 31 May 1937 and shot the same day.

Footnotes

1886 births
1937 deaths
People from Rybinsky District, Yaroslavl Oblast
People from Rybinsky Uyezd
Russian Social Democratic Labour Party members
Old Bolsheviks
Politburo of the Central Committee of the Communist Party of the Soviet Union candidate members
People's commissars and ministers of the Soviet Union
Right Opposition
Russian military personnel of World War I
Russian people executed by the Soviet Union
Great Purge victims from Russia
Soviet rehabilitations